Giuseppe Ticli (born 5 April 1979) is an Italian footballer who plays as a midfielder. He spent his whole professional career at lower division, especially in Serie C1 and Serie C2.

Career
Born in Vizzolo Predabissi, The Province of Milan, Ticli started his career at Internazionale. In mid-1999, he left on loan to Padova of Serie C2, then Arezzo of Serie C1, along with Nello Russo, Giovanni Passiglia and Cristian Lizzori. In 2001–02 season, he played for Reggiana of Serie C1, which the club signed him in a co-ownership deal for 1,000 million lire (€516,457), and San Marino Calcio of Serie C2. In June 2002 Inter bought back Ticli and he signed for Monza of Serie C2, the only club he played for two seasons.

In summer 2003, he was involved a swap deal with A.C. Milan, which Ticli, Alessandro Livi, Salvatore Ferraro, and Marco Varaldi moved to AC Milan (50% for €1.75M except Livi, €1.725M); Matteo Giordano, Ronny Diuk Toma, Simone Brunelli and Matteo Deinite moved to Inter (50% for €1.5M each). Later the deal was criticized by press as made false profit to balance sheet, as the transfer fees was paid via player exchange, but in balance sheet, the nominal value could be adjusted by two clubs. The tactics is commonly used to make the transfer fees larger in Italian football.

He stayed at Monza, by then part of the Province of Milan for another season. In 2004–05 season, he left on loan to Lanciano of Serie C1, then in 2005–06 season for Serie B club Catanzaro. In January 2006, he left for Pro Patria of Serie C1 on loan.

In June 2007, the co-ownership agreement ended with AC Milan fully contracted with Ticli, but then he was released.

In January 2008, he returned to Lombardy for Pavia of Serie C2 before retired from professional football.

References

External links
 
 Profile at FIGC 

Italian footballers
Italy youth international footballers
Inter Milan players
A.C. Milan players
Calcio Padova players
S.S. Arezzo players
A.C. Reggiana 1919 players
A.S.D. Victor San Marino players
S.S. Virtus Lanciano 1924 players
A.C. Monza players
U.S. Catanzaro 1929 players
Aurora Pro Patria 1919 players
F.C. Pavia players
Serie B players
Association football midfielders
Sportspeople from the Metropolitan City of Milan
1979 births
Living people
Footballers from Lombardy